Centris cockerelli is a species in the family Apidae ("cuckoo, carpenter, digger, bumble, and honey bees"), in the order Hymenoptera ("ants, bees, wasps and sawflies").
The distribution range of Centris cockerelli includes Central America and North America.

References

Further reading

External links

Apinae
Insects described in 1899